This is a list of foreign ministers of Costa Rica.

1844............ José María Castro Madriz
1844–1846: Joaquín Bernardo Calvo Rosales
1846–1847: José María Castro Madriz
1847–1856: Joaquín Bernardo Calvo Rosales
1856–1857: Lorenzo Montúfar y Rivera
1857–1859: José Nazario Toledo
1859............ José María Castro Madriz
1859–1860: Jesús Jiménez Zamora
1861–1863: Francisco María Iglesias Llorente
1863–1868: Julián Volio Llorente
1868–1869: Aniceto Esquivel Sáenz
1869............ Juan Rafael Mata Lafuente
1869–1870: Agapito Jiménez Zamora
1870–1873: Lorenzo Montúfar y Rivera
1873............ José María Castro Madriz
1873–1874: Luis Diego Sáenz Carazo
1874–1875: Salvador Jiménez Blanco
1876............ Juan Rafael Mata Lafuente
1876............ Saturnino Lizano Gutiérrez
1876–1877: Rafael Machado y Jáuregui
1877–1883: José María Castro Madriz
1883............ Eusebio Figueroa Oreamuno
1883–1885: José María Castro Madriz
1885–1886: Ascensión Esquivel Ibarra
1886............ José Joaquín Rodríguez Zeledón
1887–1888: Ascensión Esquivel Ibarra
1888............ Pedro Pérez Zeledón
1888–1889: Manuel de Jesús Jiménez Oreamuno
1889............ Cleto González Víquez
1889............ Ezequiel Gutiérrez Iglesias
1889–1890: Ricardo Jiménez Oreamuno
1890–1891: Ezequiel Gutiérrez Iglesias
1891–1892: Pedro María de León-Páez Brown
1892............ Pedro Pérez Zeledón
1892–1894: Manuel Vicente Jiménez Oreamuno
1894–1898: Ricardo Pacheco Marchena
1898–1899: Pedro Pérez Zeledón
1902–1905: Leonidas Pacheco Cabezas
1906–1908: Luis Anderson Morúa
1909–1910: Ricardo Fernández Guardia
1910–1913: Manuel Castro Quesada
1914–1915: Manuel Castro Quesada
1915–1917: Julio Acosta García
1917–1918: Carlos Lara Iraeta
1918–1919: Tobías Zúñiga Montúfar
1919............ Guillermo Vargas Calvo
1919–1920: Andrés Venegas García
1920–1922: Alejandro Alvarado Quirós
1922............ José Andrés Coronado Alvarado
1924–1927: Juan Rafael Argüello De Vars
1927–1928: Ricardo Castro Béeche
1928–1929: Rafael Castro Quesada
1929–1930: Roberto Eustaquio Smyth Pumarejo
1930–1931: Octavio Béeche Argüello
1931–1934: Leonidas Pacheco Cabezas
1934–1936: Raúl Gurdián Rojas
1936–1937: Manuel Francisco Jiménez Ortiz
1937–1940: Tobías Zúñiga Montúfar
1940–1944: Alberto Echandi Montero
1944–1948: Julio Acosta García
1948............ José Figueres Ferrer
1948–1949: Benjamín Odio Odio
1949............ Gerardo Fernández Durán
1949–1950: Ricardo Toledo Escalante
1950–1952: Mario Echandi Jiménez
1952–1953: Fernando Lara Bustamante
1953–1956: Mario A. Esquivel Arguedas
1956–1957: Fernando Volio Sancho
1957–1958: Mario Gómez Calvo
1958–1962: Alfredo Vargas Fernández
1962–1964: Daniel Oduber Quirós
1965–1966: Mario Gómez Calvo
1966–1970: Fernando Lara Bustamante
1970–1976: Gonzalo Facio Segreda
1976–1977: Wilburg Jiménez Castro 
1977–1978: Gonzalo Facio Segreda
1978–1980: Rafael Ángel Calderón Fournier
1980–1982: Bernd H. Niehaus Quesada
1982–1983: Fernando Volio Jiménez
1983............ Armando Arauz Aguilar 
1984–1986: Carlos José Gutiérrez Gutiérrez
1986–1990: Rodrigo Madrigal Nieto
1990–1994: Bernd H. Niehaus Quesada
1994–1998: Fernando Naranjo Villalobos
1998–2002: Roberto Rojas López
2002–2006: Roberto Tovar Faja
2006–2010: Bruno Stagno Ugarte
2010–2011: René Castro
2011............ Carlos Roverssi 
2011–2014: Enrique Castillo
2014–2018: Manuel González Sanz
2018............ Epsy Campbell Barr
2018–2019: Lorena Aguilar Revelo 
2019–2020: Manuel Ventura
2020–present: Rodolfo Solano

Sources
Rulers.org – Foreign ministers A–D

Foreign
Foreign Ministers
Politicians
Foreign ministers of Costa Rica